Aqua City (Japanese: アクアシティ) is the debut album by Kiyotaka Sugiyama & Omega Tribe, released by VAP on September 21, 1983. The album peaked at #4 on the Oricon charts.

Background and composition 
With a blue-based design and a group of songs with a theme of summer and the sea, the public image of Omega Tribe and their connection with the summer and the sea had been established. After the debut song "Summer Suspicion" was released, the album was released immediately after entering Top 10, so it ranked in Top 5 on the Oricon chart. The total sales of the records and cassettes exceeded 100,000.

The position of the title and logo of the jacket was changed when it was made into a CD in August 1984. All subsequent reissues used the modified jacket, but when it was re-released as a MEG-CD in September 2016, it was returned to its original position. At the same time, the motif of the compass needle that was printed on the lower left of the first press of the record was also revived.

Track listing

Charts

Personnel 

Executive Producer: Katsuhiko Endo, Atsushi Kitamura
Director: Shigeru Matsuhashi, Ken Shiguma
Sound Adviser: Tetsuji Hayashi
Mix Engineer: Kunihiko Shimizu
Mix Assi.Engineer: Yoshiaki Matsuoka
Mix Studio: Hitone Studio
Recording Engineer: Kazuyuki Masumoto, Eiji Uchinuma, Tatsuo Sekine
Digital Mastering: SONY PCM 1610
Music Coordinator: Akira Kawashima
Artist Management: Triangle Production
Ad: Kuniyoshi Ukita & SUPER★GALAXY
Photo: Terue Ukita

References 

1983 debut albums
Omega Tribe (Japanese band) albums